This is a list of all roster changes that occurred prior to the 2018–19 Indian Super League season.

Player movement and other transactions

Team changes

Unannounced signings
The following players have appeared either in a match or on the bench for an Indian Super League club without being announced as signed.

Released players
This list includes players who were released from their club and who have yet to sign with another Indian Super League club or who have left the league.

Out on loan

References

2018–19 Indian Super League season
Lists of Indian Super League transfers
India
2018–19 in Indian football